Flight 213 may refer to:

Aeroflot Flight 213 crashed on 18 September 1962
Bhoja Air Flight 213, crashed on 20 April 2012

0213